Marina Janicke (later Höhne, born 19 June 1954) is a retired East German diver who won bronze medals in the 3 m springboard and 10 m platform at the 1972 Olympics. She won silver medals in these events at the 1970 European Championships, and a bronze in the springboard at the 1973 World Championships.

References

1954 births
Living people
Olympic divers of East Germany
Divers at the 1972 Summer Olympics
Olympic bronze medalists for East Germany
Olympic medalists in diving
Medalists at the 1972 Summer Olympics
World Aquatics Championships medalists in diving
German female divers